Kellie Pickler is the second studio album by American country music singer Kellie Pickler. The lead-off single, "Don't You Know You're Beautiful", was debuted at the 43rd Academy Of Country Music awards and peaked at number 21 on Hot Country Songs. The album was released via BNA Records/19 Recordings on September 30, 2008. Since the albums' release, three more singles have charted; "Best Days of Your Life" at number 9 (which Pickler co-wrote with singer-songwriter Taylor Swift), "Didn't You Know How Much I Loved You" at number 14 (a re-recording of an album cut from Pickler's debut album Small Town Girl) and "Makin' Me Fall in Love Again" at number 30.

Critical reception

Billboard contributor Ken Tucker gave praise to "Somebody to Love Me" and "One Last Time" for being "aching and sincere with production to match" and highlighted "Best Days of Your Life" as "one of the album's best cuts." He later called Pickler's record "another solid step toward country stardom." Chris Neal of Country Weekly also called it "a confident step forward that finds her developing as both vocalist and songwriter, especially with the clutch of alternately sad, angry and funny post-breakup songs that dominate the album." Robert Christgau cited "Rocks Instead of Rice" as a "choice cut", indicating a good song on "an album that isn't worth your time or money." AllMusic's Stephen Thomas Erlewine was critical of the record, saying it was devoid of the cornball charm and girl-next-door ennui that encapsulated Small Town Girl, and was replaced with overly produced country pop tracks that bring out Pickler's limitations as a vocalist.

Track listing
All tracks are produced by Chris Lindsey.

Personnel

 David Angell – violin
 Tom Bukovac – electric guitar
 John Catchings – cello
 Lisa Cochran – background vocals
 Perry Coleman – background vocals
 J.T. Corenflos – electric guitar
 Eric Darken – percussion
 David Davidson – violin
 Dan Dugmore – pedal steel guitar
 Shannon Forrest – drums, percussion
 Paul Franklin – pedal steel guitar
 Tony Harrell – Hammond B-3 organ, piano, synthesizer
 Mark Hill – bass guitar
 Troy Lancaster – electric guitar
 Chris Lindsey – acoustic guitar, electric guitar, horn arrangements, synthesizer arrangements
 Gordon Mote – Hammond B-3 organ, piano, synthesizer
 Jimmy Nichols – Hammond B-3 organ, piano, synthesizer
 Kellie Pickler – lead vocals
 Karyn Rochelle – background vocals
 Pam Sixfin – violin
 Jimmie Lee Sloas – bass guitar
 Taylor Swift – background vocals on "Best Days of Your Life"
 Ilya Toshinsky – acoustic guitar
 Kris Wilkinson – viola, string arrangements
 Glenn Worf – bass guitar

Promotion
To help promoting the album, Kellie Pickler was released in a regular edition (which only includes the CD) and a Deluxe Edition, including the normal CD, along with a special DVD with 30-minute footage from Pickler on her tour and behind the scenes of the recording process (called "A Day on the Road"), and the music video for "Don't You Know You're Beautiful".

The Deluxe Edition features three bonus tracks if bought on a digital retailer (such as iTunes); "Anything But Me", "Happy," and a cover of Keith Whitley's "Don't Close Your Eyes".

Chart performance
The album debuted at number nine on the U.S. Billboard 200 chart, selling about 43,000 copies in its first week. The album has thus far spent 48 weeks on the Billboard 200 chart and has sold 440,000 copies as of December 22, 2010. It debuted at number one on the U.S. Top Country Albums chart, her second consecutive album to do so.

Weekly charts

Year-end charts

Singles

References

2008 albums
BNA Records albums
Kellie Pickler albums
Albums produced by Chris Lindsey
19 Recordings albums